Credit counseling (known in the United Kingdom as Debt counseling) is commonly a process that is used to help individual debtors with debt settlement through education, budgeting and the use of a variety of tools with the goal to reduce and ultimately eliminate debt. Credit counseling is most often done by Credit counseling agencies that are empowered by contract to act on behalf of the debtor to negotiate with creditors to resolve debt that is beyond a debtor's ability to pay. Some of the agencies are non-profits that charge at no or non-fee rates, while others can be for-profit and include high fees. Regulations on credit counseling and Credit counseling agencies varies by country and sometimes within regions of the countries themselves. In the United States, individuals filing Chapter 13 bankruptcy are required to receive counseling.

Overview
In the United States, the National Foundation for Credit Counseling was established in 1951. The modern practice known as ‘‘credit counseling’’ was initiated by creditor banks and credit card companies during the mid-1960s to address the growing volume of personal bankruptcies.

Although there is variation from country to country and even in regions within country, consumer debt is primarily made up of home loans, credit card debt and car loans. Credit counseling includes an array of services to address consumer debt that is not within the debtor's ability to pay, such as education about credit personal finance, budgeting and debt management. In addition to education, a popular credit counseling option is the ‘‘Debt management plan’’ (‘‘DMP’’, known in the United Kingdom as the Individual voluntary arrangement or "IVA"). In order to initiate a DMP, a consumer would authorize the credit counselor to contact each of the consumer’s unsecured creditors and negotiate with each creditor to lower the consumer’s monthly payment amount, to lower the interest rate, and to waive any outstanding late fees. The debt was then ‘‘consolidated’’ into a single payment.

Credit counselors can sometimes negotiate debt relief, where part or whole of an individual debt is forgiven. Another option is Debt consolidation, in which one new loan replaces multiple unsecured credit debts. The Debt-snowball method is a budgeting approach that addresses debt systematically.

Criticism
Global criticism of credit counseling comes primarily from predatory practices that take advantage of debtors that are already struggling. These practices include failing to meet required standards, charging unlawful or unreasonable fees, failing to provide affordable solutions for consumers, and neglecting to make customers aware of free debt services available elsewhere.

Regulations by country

United States
In the United States, Credit counseling agencies are loosely regulated by the Federal Trade Commission (FTC), the nation’s consumer protection agency, which can sue companies that have deceived consumers about the cost, nature, or benefits of their services. Different states may regulate DMPs individually and Attorneys General are empowered to protect state citizens from fraud. Two professional associations represent Credit counselors: the National Foundation for Credit Counseling and the Association of Independent Consumer Credit Counseling Agencies.

United Kingdom
In the United Kingdom, the Financial Conduct Authority is responsible for the regulation of consumer credit and has established a Debt Management Plan Protocol. It can impose fines for improper conduct.

European Union
Elsewhere in the European Union, regulation and non-regulation of Credit counseling agencies and their approaches, including DMPs, are widely varied. In Sweden, guidelines for credit counseling are loosely provided by the Swedish Confederation of Professional Employees (TCO) and creditors are encouraged to use them in lieu of the court system. In Ireland, the Irish Congress of Trade Unions (ICTU) provides debt resolution information directly to debtors. In Latvia, a debt advisory company called LAKRA works with employers to assist indebted employees.

Canada
The Financial Consumer Agency of Canada (FCAC) advises Canadians to do their research and find a trustworthy organization and a qualified counselor. They suggest making sure an agency is in good standing with a provincial or national association. They recommend looking carefully at the agency's advertising to see if it sounds too good to be true. Claims or misrepresentations to look out for can include repaying only a fraction of your debt, quickly fixing your credit score, or claiming to be part of a government program. They also suggest consumers inquire about an agency's services, costs, and counselor qualifications. The FCAC has also warns Canadians to be careful of companies offering to help them pay off their debt or repair their credit. Things to watch out for include guarantees to solve debt problems and using high interest loans to pay off debt. Some of these companies also claim that they can file a consumer proposal on behalf of a consumer. However, the FCAC points out that only a qualified licensed insolvency trustee can help someone with a consumer proposal or bankruptcy.

South Africa
The National Credit Regulator (NCR) was established as the regulator under the National Credit Act No. 34 of 2005 (The Act) and is responsible for the regulation of the South African credit industry. It is tasked with carrying out education, research, policy development, registration of industry participants, investigation of complaints, and ensuring the enforcement of the Act. The NCR is also tasked with the registration of credit providers, credit bureau and debt counselors; and with the enforcement of compliance with the Act. Debt Counselling was introduced and enforced in 2007. This enabled over-indebted consumers to seek relief in accordance to the National Credit Act (NCA). The NCA has been amended several times since inception and various new regulations published.

See also
National Foundation for Debt Management

References

External links
 Debt Settlement Advice from US Federal Trade Commission
 National Foundation for Credit Counseling

Debt
United States bankruptcy law
2005 in law
Counseling
Personal finance